Ian Britton (19 May 1954 – 31 March 2016) was a Scottish footballer who played as a midfielder for clubs in England and Scotland, including Chelsea, Blackpool and Burnley.

Playing career

Chelsea 

Britton started his career with Scottish amateur side Hillside Rangers. Aged 17 he signed as an apprentice with Londoners Chelsea in the summer of 1971, making his debut during the 1972–73 season against Derby County on 30 December 1972. With Chelsea's relegation from the First Division in 1975, which saw the departure of many of the club's established players, Britton became a regular in the first team. He was a key part of manager Eddie McCreadie's young side, alongside the likes of Ray Wilkins, Steve Finnieston and Tommy Langley, which won promotion back to the top flight in 1976–77.

Chelsea were relegated once again following the 1978–79 season and remained in the old Second Division for the remainder of his time at Stamford Bridge, which came to an end in August 1982 when he returned to his home town and signed for Dundee United. In total, he played 289 games and scored 34 goals for Chelsea.

Dundee United 

As a Dundee United player in the 1982–83 season, Britton helped the club win the Scottish league championship for the only time in their history. His only league goal came in a 3–3 draw with Hibernian on 26 March 1983. He also scored against Raith Rovers in the League Cup on 21 August 1982.

Blackpool 

After playing two games for Arbroath at the start of the 1983–84 season, Britton joined Blackpool in November on a one-month loan deal. He impressed manager Sam Ellis, who signed him permanently for a small fee when his loan period expired.

In his first season at Bloomfield Road, his goal tally was bettered only by Paul Stewart, and his best period came when he teamed up in midfield with Mike Conroy.

Britton was in the Blackpool side that won promotion from the Fourth Division in 1985, swapping places with his next club Burnley, whom he joined in August 1986. But, such were the finances at Turf Moor, that manager Brian Miller was initially only able to sign him on loan.

Burnley 

Britton's headed goal for the Clarets, three minutes into the second half of the final game of the 1986–87 season, secured a 2–1 win over promotion chasing Leyton Orient, helping to preserve Burnley's Football League status.

Many of the side that played against Orient were subsequently released. Britton was one of only 2 members of that team to feature in the starting eleven at Wembley just one year later the other being Ray Deakin, when the Clarets faced Wolverhampton Wanderers in the Associate Members' Cup Final in front of 80,841 fans, a record for the trophy.

The 1988–89 season proved to be Britton's last at Burnley and his last in League football. He'd scored his first goal for the club in a 2–1 defeat at Tranmere Rovers, and in January 1989 he scored at Prenton Park once again in what proved to be manager Brian Miller's final game in charge. Miller was replaced by Frank Casper and although Britton remained in the side for much of the remainder of the season, he was released at the end of his third year with the club.

Retirement 
Having ended his professional career, Britton became involved in local semi-professional football, briefly managing Nelson in the mid-1990s. He lived in East Lancashire where he was the manager of the Seedhill Athletics and Fitness Centre operated by Pendle Leisure Trust.

On 31 March 2016, it was reported that Britton had died of cancer at the age of 61.

References

External links 
Clarets-Mad Player Profile

1954 births
2016 deaths
Footballers from Dundee
Scottish footballers
Arbroath F.C. players
Blackpool F.C. players
Burnley F.C. players
Chelsea F.C. players
Dundee United F.C. players
Morecambe F.C. players
Nelson F.C. managers
Scottish Football League players
English Football League players
Association football midfielders
Scottish football managers
Place of death missing